Wajdi Mejri (born 28 May 1989) is a Tunisian footballer who plays as a forward.

References

1989 births
Living people
Tunisian footballers
CS Sfaxien players
JS Kairouan players
Étoile Sportive du Sahel players
EGS Gafsa players
Stade Gabèsien players
ES Zarzis players
CO Médenine players
Jendouba Sport players
CS M'saken players
Al-Sharq Club players
Association football forwards
Tunisian Ligue Professionnelle 1 players
Saudi Second Division players
Tunisian expatriate footballers
Expatriate footballers in Saudi Arabia
Tunisian expatriate sportspeople in Saudi Arabia